FC Benkovski is a football club based in Byala, Bulgaria. Its home stadium Georgi Benkovski has a capacity of 3000 seats. Club colors are blue and red.

Current squad 

For recent transfers, see List of Bulgarian football transfers summer 2014.

League positions
  

Benkovski
1931 establishments in Bulgaria